Letovica is a City in the municipality of Bujanovac, Serbia. According to the 2002 census, the City has a population of 1126 people. Of these, 1115 (99,02 %) were ethnic Albanians, and 10 	(0,88 %) others.

References

Populated places in Pčinja District
Albanian communities in Serbia